PAJ: A Journal of Performance and Art, originally Performing Arts Journal, is a triannual academic journal of the arts that was established in 1976 by Gautam Dasgupta and Bonnie Marranca, who still is the editor-in-chief. It has taken a particular interest in contemporary performance art and features expanded coverage in video, drama, dance, installations, media, and music and publishes essays, interviews and artists' writings, reviews of new exhibitions, performances, and books, and also plays and performance texts from the United States and elsewhere. The journal is published by MIT Press. PAJ Publications, the journal's book division, regularly publishes plays and essay collections on theater and performance.

Abstracting and indexing
The journal is abstracted and indexed in:
Arts and Humanities Citation Index

Current Contents/Arts & Humanities

EBSCO databases
International Bibliography of Periodical Literature
Modern Language Association Database
ProQuest databases
Scopus

Books
PAJ Publications, the journal's book division, publishes titles on theater and performance. The book division's long-running series Word Plays was dedicated to new American theatre, while Drama Contemporary collected translations of new plays from across Europe and Asia. Performance Ideas has featured plays, essays, and conversations. 

Previously affiliated with Johns Hopkins University Press, PAJ Publications is currently distributed through Theatre Communications Group.

References

External links

Publications established in 1976
Triannual journals
Arts journals
English-language journals
MIT Press academic journals